Moammar Rana (Punjabi, ; born February 26, 1974), is a Pakistani actor and film director.  He is known for his various Lollywood movie credits, and has also worked on the small screen in Pakistani soap operas and Television Serials.

Family
Moammar Rana belongs to a cricketing dynasty: his father Shafqat Rana has played some Test matches for Pakistan and also served as national cricket team selector twice, his uncle Azmat Rana (d. 2015) played one Test match, another uncle, Shakoor Rana (d. 2001), was a well-known umpire whose two sons Mansoor and Maqsood played a few ODIs, while yet another uncle, Sultan Rana, played first-class matches before becoming a cricket administrator.

Career

Films
Moammar Rana appeared in the film Kudiyon Ko Dale Dana as a second lead actor. He got his first break in Deewane Tere Pyar Ke. In 1999, he appeared in the ensemble romantic film Pal Do Pal, which was directed by late Shamim Ara. He has also appeared in the films Channa Sachi Muchi, Fire, Jhoomar,  and Koi Tujh Sa Kahan. Moammar's film Choorian which was directed by Syed Noor became the highest grossing Pakistani Punjabi film earning Rs20 crore (US$4.4 million) at the box office.

He has worked in the Bollywood film Dobara (2004) with actress Mahima Chaudhry in a special appearance and made his Bollywood debut in Ek Second... Jo Zindagi Badal De? opposite Manisha Koirala and former Miss India Nikita Anand.

In 2018, Rana was seen in the film Azaadi which was based on the issue of Jammu and Kashmir, and was directed and produced by Imran Malik. Despite receiving unfavorable reviews, the film emerged as a success on local box office.

Television
Moammar has also appeared in some television soaps such as Dil, Diya, Dehleez, Love Life and Lahore, and Ishq Ibadat.

Director
Moammar is set to make his debut as film director for the film Sikander, where he plays the lead actor, which has been in making since 2015.

Selected filmography

Films

Dramas
 Hawa Pe Raqs (TV series) PTV 
 Uss Paar (TV series) (ATV (Pakistan))
 Dil Mera Mera Nahi 
 Sirf Tumhare Liye 
 Suhana  ATV (Pakistan)
 Ankh Salamat Andhay Log (TV series) (ATV (Pakistan))
 Laaj (TV series) (TVOne Pakistan)
 Nazar (2011) (PTV)
 Kaisi Hain Doorian
 Meray Paas Paas (2007)
 Banjar (TV series) (2006)
 Love, Life Aur Lahore as Pari Paiker (2010)
 Ishq Ibadat (2011)
 Roshan Sitara (2012)
 Dil, Diya, Dehleez (Hum TV)
 Judaai (TV series)
 Mehram (Hum TV)

As director
 Sikander (2016)

Awards

Lux Style Awards

See also 
 List of Lollywood actors

References

External links
 

1974 births
Living people
Male actors in Punjabi cinema
Male actors in Urdu cinema
Nigar Award winners
Pakistani film directors
Pakistani male film actors
Pakistani male television actors
Punjabi people
St. Anthony's High School, Lahore alumni
People from Lahore